Kattamanchi is suburb of Chittoor in Chittoor district, Andhra Pradesh, India. It is on the banks of the Neeva River. It connects the national highway from Chittoor to Tirupathi, Kadapa and Kurnool. In Kattamanchi the language spoken is Telugu. It is a pilgrimage center.

Notable people
Cattamanchi Ramalinga Reddy, an Indian poet and political thinker, was born in Kattamanchi

References

Towns in Chittoor district